Subgenus Xiphium is a subgenus of Iris. If considered a separate genus from Iris, it is known as genus Xiphion.

The Latin specific epithet Xiphium refers to the Greek word for sword xiphos.

All species in this subgenus are true bulbs, and are native to southwest Europe (southern Spain, Portugal and southern France) and northern Africa.

Mainly known for the garden cultivars known as Dutch Iris, Spanish Iris and English Iris. They generally flower between early to mid-summer and each stem produces between 1 - 3 flowers.
Most bulbs should be planted in late autumn, 10 cm deep and between 5–10 cm apart.

Section Xiphium

Iris boissieri Henriq
Iris filifolia Boiss.
Iris juncea Poir.
Iris latifolia Mill. – English iris
Iris rutherfordii M Rodriguez,P Vargas,M Carine and S Jury 
Iris serotina Willk. in Willk. & Lange
Iris tingitana Boiss. & Reut. – Morocco iris
Iris xiphium L.

Horticultural hybrids
Iris × hollandica (Spanish iris, Dutch iris)

References

Iris (plant)
Plant subgenera